Prince Isaravongs Vorarajakumara or Phra Chao Boromwongse Ther Phra Ong Chao Isaravongs Vorarajakumara (RTGS: Isarawong Woraratchakumarn) (4 September 1870 – 5 June 1872), was a Prince of Siam (later Thailand). He was a member of the Siamese Royal Family. He was a son of Chulalongkorn, King Rama V of Siam.

His mother was Saeng Galyanamitra (daughter of Phraya Jayavichit, son of Chao Phraya Nikara Bodindra (Toh) who built Galyanamitra Temple). Princess Isaravongs Vorarajakumara had 3 siblings: 1 elder brother and 2 younger sisters:
 Prince Nabhanka Nibandhabongs (8 August 1874 – 17 September 1876)
 Princess Beatrice Bhadrayuvadi (5 December 1876 – 30 September 1913)
 Princess Charoensri Chanamayu (31 March 1878 – 24 December 1916)

Prince Isaravongs Vorarajakumara died in infancy on 17 September 1876, at the age of 1 year 9 months.

Ancestry

1870 births
1872 deaths
19th-century Thai royalty who died as children
19th-century Chakri dynasty
Thai male Phra Ong Chao
Children of Chulalongkorn
Sons of kings